Nishikant Dubey (born 28 January 1969) is a member of India's 17th Lok Sabha, the lower house of the Indian Parliament. He is a member of the Bharatiya Janata Party and represents the Godda constituency in Jharkhand since May 2009, having won the seat in 2009 (15-th Lok Sabha), 2014, and 2019.

Education and background
Nishikant Dubey has been active in politics since 2009. Prior to that he was the corporate head of the Essar Group. He married Anamika Gautam in the year 2000. He holds a BA degree from Marwari College Bhagalpur, MBA from Delhi University and a Doctorate from Pratap University in Jaipur.

Posts held

See also

List of members of the 15th Lok Sabha of India
List of members of the 16th Lok Sabha of India
List of members of the 17th Lok Sabha of India

References

External links
 FMS Delhi

India MPs 2009–2014
Living people
1969 births
Bharatiya Janata Party politicians from Jharkhand
Businesspeople from Bihar
Faculty of Management Studies – University of Delhi alumni
Delhi University alumni
Lok Sabha members from Jharkhand
India MPs 2014–2019
People from Bhagalpur district
People from Godda district
India MPs 2019–present